Roberto Mauro Silva Reis (born 2 March 1980) is a Portuguese volleyball player who plays for Sporting and the Portugal national team.

Reis also competes in Beach Volleyball, together with Kibinho, winning the national championship in 2010, 2011, 2012 and 2014.

Career
Born in Esmoriz, Reis started his professional career as an 18-year-old in his hometown club, Esmoriz Ginásio Clube, which led him to his debut for the national team against Czech Republic in 2000.

After a brief spell in the Italian Volleyball League, he moved to Sporting de Espinho, taking part in the conquest of four national titles and one cup. In 2009, he signed with Vitória de Guimarães, but stayed just one year, as he joined Benfica, helping them win an historic three-peat, plus two cups. In 2017, he was released by Benfica and returned to Sporting de Espinho. A year later, he went back to Lisbon to play for Sporting.

In international level, Reis competed at 2008 Olympic Qualification Tournament in Espinho, where Portugal ended up in second place and missed qualification for the 2008 Summer Olympics in Beijing, China.

Honours
Sporting Espinho
Portuguese First Division:  2005–06, 2006–07, 2008–09, 2009–10
Portuguese Volleyball Cup: 2007–08

Benfica
Portuguese First Division: 2012–13, 2013–14, 2014–15, 2016–17
Portuguese Volleyball Cup: 2011–12, 2014–15
Portuguese Volleyball Super Cup (6): 2011, 2012, 2013, 2014, 2015, 2016

Portugal
2002 World Championship — 8th place
2008 Olympic Qualification Tournament — 2nd place (did not qualify)

References

External links
 FIVB biography

1980 births
Living people
People from Ovar
Portuguese men's volleyball players
S.L. Benfica volleyball players
Sporting CP volleyball players
Sportspeople from Aveiro District